Matidia simplex, is a species of spider of the genus Matidia. It is endemic to Sri Lanka.

See also 
 List of Clubionidae species

References

Spiders described in 1897
Clubionidae
Endemic fauna of Sri Lanka
Spiders of Asia